The men's long jump at the 2010 African Championships in Athletics was held on July 28–29.

Medalists

Results

Qualification
Qualifying perf. 7.85 (Q) or 12 best performers (q) advanced to the Final.

Final

External links
Results

Long
Long jump at the African Championships in Athletics